Craspedocephalus gramineus, known as the bamboo pit viper, Indian green pit viper, or common green pit viper, is a venomous pit viper species found in the southern and north eastern parts of India. No subspecies are currently recognized.

Description
The rostral scale is as deep as broad or broader than deep. The upper head-scales are small, smooth, imbricate; supraocular scale narrow, rarely broken up. The internasals are contact or separated by one or two scales. There are 8 to 13 scales on a line between the supraoculars; usually one or two, rarely three, series of scales between the suboculars and the labials; 9 to 12 upper labials, second usually forming the anterior border of the loreal pit, third largest; temporal scales smooth. The dorsal scales are more or less distinctly keeled, in 21 (rarely 19 or 23) rows; ventrals 145–175; anal scale entire; subcaudals in two rows 53–76.

The upper parts are usually bright green, rarely yellowish, greyish, or purplish brown, with or without black, brown, or reddish spots; usually a light, white, yellow, or red streak along the outer row of scales; end of tail frequently yellow or red; lower parts green, yellow, or whitish.

Taxonomy and common names
It was first described in 1802 as Coluber graminaeus. No subspecies are recognized.

Common names include: bamboo pit viper, Indian tree viper, bamboo snake, Indian green tree viper, green tree viper, bamboo viper, bamboo pitviper, boodro pam, grass-green snake, and green pit viper.

Geographic range
The range of this species has been restricted to southern India especially widespread in a large area of Tamil Nadu. It is also very rarely seen near Harishchandragad and some other mountain ranges of Western Ghats (Sahyadris in Maharashtra). This snake is also found albeit very scarcely in the eastern region of India spanning from Odisha, Jharkhand, and West Bengal.

The type locality is "Vizagapatam, India", which is based on Russell (1796).

Habitat
It is found in bamboo groves and forests, usually near streams.

Behaviour
C. gramineus is arboreal and nocturnal. When threatened, it is aggressive and does not hesitate to bite. The venom is hemotoxic and neurotoxic.

Diet
It feeds on lizards, rats and birds.

Reproduction
C. gramineus is ovoviviparous.

References

Further reading

Cantor, T.E. 1839. Spicilegium serpentium indicorum [parts 1 and 2]. Proc. Zool. Soc. London 7: 31–34, 49–55.
Gumprecht, A.; Tillack, F.; Orlov, N.L.; Captain, A. & Ryabow, S. 2004. Asian Pit Vipers. Geitje Books. Berlin. 368 pp.
Russell, P. 1796. An Account of Indian Serpents, Collected on the Coast of Coromandel; Containing Descriptions and Drawings of Each Species, Together with Experiments and Remarks on Their Several Poisons. George Nicol. London. viii + 91 pp. + Plates I.- XLVI.
Shaw, G. 1802. General Zoology, or Systematic Natural History: Vol. III., Part II. G. Kearsley. (Thomas Davison, Printer). London. iv + pp. 313–615 + Plates 87–140. ("Coluber Gramineus", pp. 420–421.).
Stejneger, L. 1927. The green pit viper, Trimeresurus gramineus, in China. Proceedings of the United States National Museum 72 (19): 1–10.

gramineus
Reptiles described in 1802
Endemic fauna of India
Snakes of Asia